Christopher Dighton or Deighton may refer to one of two men who ast as Member of Parliament for Worcester:
 Christopher Dighton (died 1587)
 Christopher Dighton (1559–1604)